De Angeli is a station on Line 1 of the Milan Metro in Milan, Italy. The underground station was opened in 1966 and is located at Piazza Ernesto De Angeli.

History 
The station was opened on 2 April 1966 as part of the section between Pagano and Gambara.

References

Line 1 (Milan Metro) stations
Railway stations opened in 1966